The 1892 Minnesota gubernatorial election took place on November 8, 1892. Republican Party of Minnesota candidate Knute Nelson defeated Democratic Party of Minnesota challenger Daniel W. Lawler and People's Party candidate Ignatius L. Donnelly.

Results

See also
 List of Minnesota gubernatorial elections

External links
 http://www.sos.state.mn.us/home/index.asp?page=653
 http://www.sos.state.mn.us/home/index.asp?page=657

Minnesota
Gubernatorial
1892
November 1892 events